"Still I" is a 2007 song by R&B singer CeCe Peniston, recorded in collaboration with Rodney R.K. Jackson and Felipe “Wax” Delgado, who initially found success producing and co-writing the Peniston’s gold-certified album Finally on A&M Records in 1992.

The composition, written by both industry veterans, altogether with Nick "Cello" Valentine (with whom they formed a new production crew called SandWorx), was to be released on Heat City Records, a music company that dissolved in 1996, and resurrected in 2006 with the signing of Krieg Nation. 

After their reunion with Peniston herself, producers intended to record a full length R&B album for her, but the singer didn't decide to proceed with the project, and after working on another three tracks ("Wonder Woman", "Next to Me" and "Right Here") she eventually didn't expect either "Still I" to go public. Nevertheless, the record was released in September 2007 as a download single on Adrenaline Music, which included in total four mixes by Sandworx.

Credits and personnel
 CeCe Peniston - lead vocal, writer, Jimmie Alston
 Rodney K. Jackson - writer, producer
 Felipe Delgado - writer, producer
 Nick "Cello" Valentine - writer, producer
 SandWorx - remix

Track listing and format
 MD, US, #()
 "Still I" (Sandworx Original Mix) - 4:16
 "Still I" (Sandworx Club Mix) - 6:21
 "Still I" (Radio Mix) - 3:41
 "Still I" (Instrumental) - 4:14

References

General

 Specific

External links
 

2007 singles
CeCe Peniston songs
2007 songs
Songs written by CeCe Peniston
Songs written by Felipe Delgado (record producer)